Massachusetts Senate's Norfolk, Worcester and Middlesex district, formerly Massachusetts Senate's Norfolk, Bristol and Middlesex district, in the United States is one of 40 legislative districts of the Massachusetts Senate. It used to cover 8.6% of Bristol County, 2.0% of Middlesex County, and 12.4% of Norfolk County population. Democrat Becca Rausch of Needham has represented the district since 2019.

Towns represented
The current Norfolk, Worcester, and Middlesex district represents the following:

Bellingham
Dover
 Franklin
 Medfield
 Milford
 Millis
 Needham
 Norfolk
 Sherborn
 Plainville
 Wrentham

The old district included the following localities:
 Attleboro
 Franklin
 Millis
 Natick
 Needham
 Norfolk
 North Attleborough
 Plainville
 Sherborn
 Wayland
 Wellesley
 Wrentham

Senators 
 David Henry Locke, circa 1979-1985 
 Cheryl Jacques, circa 1993-2002 
Scott Brown, Mar. 25, 2004-Feb. 4, 2010 
 Richard J. Ross, circa 2010-2018 
 Becca Rausch, 2019-current

Electoral History
The state senate district has been held by a Democrat since 2019. Prior to the election of Senator Rausch, it was held by Republicans since 2019.

2022 Norfolk, Worcester and Middlesex General Election

2020 Norfolk, Bristol and Middlesex General Election

2018 Norfolk, Bristol and Middlesex General Election

2016 Norfolk, Bristol and Middlesex General Election

2014 Norfolk, Bristol and Middlesex General Election

2012 Norfolk, Bristol and Middlesex General Election

2010 Norfolk, Bristol and Middlesex General Election

2010 Norfolk, Bristol and Middlesex Special General Election

2008 Norfolk, Bristol and Middlesex Special General Election

2006 Norfolk, Bristol and Middlesex General Election

Images
Portraits of legislators

See also
 List of Massachusetts Senate elections
 List of Massachusetts General Courts
 List of former districts of the Massachusetts Senate
 Bristol County districts of the Massachusetts House of Representatives: 1st, 2nd, 3rd, 4th, 5th, 6th, 7th, 8th, 9th, 10th, 11th, 12th, 13th, 14th
 Middlesex County districts of the Massachusetts House of Representatives: 1st, 2nd, 3rd, 4th, 5th, 6th, 7th, 8th, 9th, 10th, 11th, 12th, 13th, 14th, 15th, 16th, 17th, 18th, 19th, 20th, 21st, 22nd, 23rd, 24th, 25th, 26th, 27th, 28th, 29th, 30th, 31st, 32nd, 33rd, 34th, 35th, 36th, 37th
 Norfolk County districts of the Massachusetts House of Representatives: 1st, 2nd, 3rd, 4th, 5th, 6th, 7th, 8th, 9th, 10th, 11th, 12th, 13th, 14th, 15th

References

External links
 Ballotpedia
  (State Senate district information based on U.S. Census Bureau's American Community Survey).
 
 League of Women Voters of Needham

Senate 
Government of Bristol County, Massachusetts
Government of Middlesex County, Massachusetts
Government of Norfolk County, Massachusetts
Massachusetts Senate